Prem Nath (June 6, 1941), Ar. Prem Nath is an Iconic Indian architect with a wide spectrum of work, also The Most Admired Architect in India. Awarded Architect of Baburao Mhatre Gold Medal 2019 during the virtual event of NATCON 2020 by the Indian Institution of Architects (IIA) with a citation describing him as a "Seminal Architect" and a "Trail Blazer" in the field of architecture. Ar. Prem Nath has many "FIRSTS", to his credit which includes First ever Revolving Restaurant, First Health Spa, First Multiplex Mall in the Country, First Fast track I.T Building, First Gold graded & HUDCO Award winner Township, First Platinum Rated School & many more to the list. He is the founder of Prem Nath and Associates, an architectural firm based in Mumbai, founded in 1967.Additionally, Mr. Nath is a Chartered Engineer, a Certified Valuer and Real Estate Appraiser In a career spanning 50 long years, he has received many awards such as “Most Promising Brand” in Architecture and Real Estate at World Brand Summit, Dubai, “Life Time Achievement Award”, “India’s Top Ten Architect” award and “HUDCO Design Award for Green Architecture for HMEL Township and many more.

Early life 
He completed his schooling in Delhi, and started working with an engineering firm where he used to take blueprints for draughtsmen. There he developed his interest in the field of architecture and enrolled himself in a graduate diploma program at Sir J.J. College of Architecture, Mumbai. After completing his diploma with highest honors from Sir J. J. College of Architecture in 1965, he started his career as an interior designer and used to work hard for 18–20 hours a day.

Career 
He was invited by J.A. Stein to work with him but he preferred to stay in Mumbai and opened his own firm Prem Nath & Associates in 1967. He is a member of the American Society Of interior designers and a fellow of the institution of Engineers (India) Charted Engineers. He has won the Architect of the year award in 1996 from Accommodation Times, the International Award if Architectural practices in 2005 from Actualidad, Spain. He is known for taking some leading initiatives such as India's first Revolving Restaurant – Ambassador Hotel, Mumbai. India's first Platinum Rated School campus – Cygnus World School in Vadodara, Gujarat, India's first Multiplex-Mall – Fame Adlabs at Citimall, Andheri, Mumbai designed for Ajmera Group, in early 2000s, India's first green rated township, HMEL Punjab.

Memberships and Certifications 
Fellow of Indian Institute of Architects (IIA), Ex president of Indian Institute Of Interior Designers (IIID). He is one of the few designers in the country to have received the ASID (American Society Of Interior Designers) certification. Also the member of U.S. Green Building Council (USGBC) and Indian Green Building Council (IGBC) President of AAJJA (Alumni Association of Sir J.J. College of Architecture, Mumbai).

Projects 
Some of the Notable Projects are listed below:
 Golden Palm Resort, Bangalore 
 HMEL Township, Bhatinda
 Cygnus World School, Gujarat
 Celebrity Homes
 Bhakti Park, Residential Complex, Mumbai

Awards 

 “India’s Most Admired Architects - 2021: by Golden Aims
 "India's Top Architect Award 2020" - by Construction World Architect & Builder Awards
 “IIA Gold Medal 2019” – India’s Top Architectural award 
 "Life Time Achievement Award 2020" by Reality+ INEX Awards, Mumbai
 Awarded with " Archid-Lifetime Achievement Award 2019" by Archid, Mumbai.
 Bestowed with "DNA Sir J.J. Architecture Award'18" by Sir J.J. College of Architecture.
 Design Legend Award by Society Interiors 2015
 HUDCO Design Award 2015 for Green Architecture;

Gallery

References

External links 
 Official Website

1941 births
Living people
20th-century Indian architects